Bunagana, is a small town in Rutshuru Territory, North Kivu Province, in eastern Democratic Republic of the Congo, at the border with Uganda. It served as the headquarters of the M23 rebel militia in 2013 and is, since 13 June 2022, being occupied by March 23 Movement

As of 13 October 2022 the rebels had consolidated their control of the area surrounding the town.  The Congolese border post was operating under rebel control with ongoing commercial exchanges with Uganda. 

United States Senate Foreign Relations Committee Chair Bob Menendez has stated that “Rwandan support for M23 rebels who are attacking civilians, UN peacekeepers, and FARDC in Eastern DRC is unacceptable” and has called for Bureau of African Affairs to “immediately investigate and hold those responsible to account”

Location

See also
Bunagana, Uganda
Goma
North Kivu Province
Virunga National Park

References

External links
Location of Bunagana, DRC At Google Maps

Cities in the Great Rift Valley
Populated places in North Kivu
Democratic Republic of the Congo–Uganda border crossings